The President's Committee on the Arts and the Humanities (PCAH) was an advisory committee to the White House on cultural issues. It worked directly with the Administration and the three primary cultural agencies: the National Endowment for the Arts, National Endowment for the Humanities, and the Institute of Museum and Library Services, as well as other federal partners and the private sector, to address policy questions in the arts and humanities, to initiate and support public/private partnerships in those disciplines, and to recognize excellence in the field. Its core areas of focus were arts and humanities education, cultural exchange, and the creative economy.

The committee was composed of both private and public members. The private members were appointed by the president and are prominent artists, philanthropists, entrepreneurs and state and local public officials who demonstrated commitment to the arts and humanities. Its public ex officio members included the heads of the National Endowment for the Arts; the National Endowment for the Humanities; the Institute of Museum and Library Sciences; the Departments of Education, Interior, and State; the National Gallery of Art; the Smithsonian Institution; the John F. Kennedy Center for the Performing Arts; and the Library of Congress. The president also appointed a chairman or co-chairmen from among the private members.

In August 2017, all private committee members resigned in protest of then-president Donald Trump's response to the Unite the Right rally in Charlottesville, Virginia. Authority for the committee subsequently lapsed on September 30 under the provisions of Executive Order 13708.

Background
The PCAH was established by Executive Order 12367 of June 15, 1982. It has conducted major research and policy analysis, and catalyzed important federal cultural programs, both domestic and international. PCAH's website states, "These achievements rely on the PCAH's unique role in bringing together the White House, federal agencies, civic organizations, corporations, foundations and individuals to strengthen the United States' national investment in its cultural life. Central to the PCAH mission is using the power of the arts and humanities to contribute to the vibrancy of our society, the education of our children, the creativity of our citizens and the strength of our democracy."

Current programs

Turnaround Arts
Turnaround Arts was a national program that brings arts education to high-poverty elementary and middle schools across the country. It was the first federal program to specifically support arts education as an improvement tool in the country's lowest-performing schools, and was run by the PCAH, in coordination with the White House, the U.S. Department of Education (USDOE), and several foundations.

National Arts and Humanities Youth Program Awards
The National Arts and Humanities Youth Program Awards recognized the country's best creative youth development programs for increasing academic achievement, graduation rates and college enrollment by engaging children and youth in the arts and humanities. Formerly titled Coming Up Taller, these annual awards focused national attention on outstanding programs across the country that promoted the creativity of America's young people, providing them learning opportunities and the chance to contribute to their communities. Accompanied by a cash award and a ceremony at the White House with the First Lady, the National Arts and Humanities Youth Program Awards not only rewarded these projects with recognition but also provided organizational and capacity building support over the course of the year.

National Student Poets Program
The PCAH, the Institute of Museum and Library Services, and the nonprofit Alliance for Young Artists & Writers partnered to present the National Student Poets Program (NSPP), the nation's highest honor for young poets (grades 9–11) presenting original work. Five students were annually selected for one year of service as literary ambassadors, each representing a geographic region of the country. By elevating and showcasing their work for a national audience, the program strived to inspire other young people to achieve excellence in their own creative endeavors and promote the essential role of writing and the arts in academic and personal success.

Film Forward
Sundance Film Forward is an international touring program designed to enhance greater cultural understanding, collaboration and dialogue around the globe by engaging audiences through the exhibition of films, workshops and conversations with filmmakers. Sundance Film Forward is an initiative of the Sundance Institute, which partnered with the PCAH and other federal arts programs.

Save America's Treasures
Established by Executive Order in 1998, Save America's Treasures (SAT) is a federal public-private partnership that includes the NEA, NEH, IMLS, the National Park Service (NPS), the American Architectural Foundation (AAF) and formerly the PCAH. The PCAH and the National Park Service jointly oversaw the management of the federal competitive matching grant component, which helps preserve, conserve, and rescue our nation's most significant cultural and heritage resources, including historic structures, collections of artifacts, works of art, maps, manuscripts, and sound recordings. Although funding for the program was suspended, the PCAH and AAF convened a series of thought leadership forums to develop elements for framing and catalyzing a preservation strategy that built on the strengths and success of SAT.

Special initiatives
Through its work with the private sector, the PCAH was able to raise private resources, which were directed to special initiatives that supported youth programs, recognized artists, broadened arts awareness, and celebrated the nation's cultural life. Examples include:

 Educational workshops and cultural events programming at the White House
 The National Medal of Arts and National Humanities Medals
 Annual NEH Jefferson Lecture on the Humanities
 U.S. Cultural and Heritage Tourism Summit (2005)

August 2017 resignations
On August 18, 2017, 16 of the 17 committee members, including Kal Penn and Chuck Close, resigned in protest of President Donald Trump's response to the Unite the Right rally in Charlottesville, Virginia. The resigning commissioners stated in a letter to the president, "Reproach and censure in the strongest possible terms are necessary following your support of the hate groups and terrorists who killed and injured fellow Americans in Charlottesville."
The initial letters of each paragraph of the resignation letter spell 'RESIST'. The only member of the committee who did not immediately sign the letter was theater and film director George C. Wolfe, whose representatives stated that he, too, would be resigning and would add his name to the letter. PCAH became the first White House department to quit the Trump administration.

The White House responded with a statement reading in part, "Earlier this month it was decided that President Trump will not renew the Executive Order for the President's Committee on the Arts and the Humanities (PCAH), which expires later this year."

Andrew Weinstein, who had been appointed to the committee by President Obama, went on to serve on the board of the Holocaust Memorial Museum.

Former leadership

Former honorary chairwomen
Michelle Obama
Laura Bush
Hillary Clinton
Barbara Bush
Nancy Reagan

Former committee chairpeople
Co-chairmen: George Stevens, Jr. and Margo Lion
Adair Margo, appointed by President George W. Bush
Dr. John Brademas, President Emeritus of New York University appointed by President Bill Clinton
Donald J. Hall, Chairman of Hallmark Cards, Inc. appointed by President George H. W. Bush
Andrew Heiskell, former Chairman and CEO of Time, Inc. appointed by President Ronald Reagan

Former executive directors 
Megan Beyer
Rachel Goslins
Daniel (Henry) Moran
Bunny Burson
Harriet Fulbright
Ellen McCulloch-Lovell
Diane Paton

See also
 Strategic and Policy Forum (January–August 2017) – a board disbanded for similar reasons
 American Manufacturing Council (January–August 2017) – a board disbanded for similar reasons

References

External links

American art
1982 establishments in the United States
2017 disestablishments in the United States
Trump administration controversies